Kaiju Big Battel is a performance by the New York City based performance entertainment troupe created by Rand Borden. The performances are parodies of both professional wrestling and the tokusatsu kaiju eiga films of Japan. These Battels are presented in the style of professional wrestling events, with the costumed performers playing the roles of giant, city-crushing monsters similar to Godzilla and Gamera. The odd spelling of battel originates in a mistake Borden made on a T-shirt design, which became an inside joke. The performances include many in-jokes aimed towards fans of professional wrestling (especially Mexican wrestling), superhero comic books and Japanese popular culture. Many of the names of the characters are in mock Spanish or mock Japanese, and Engrish is used liberally for comedic effect.

History of Studio Kaiju
Kaiju Big Battel began as a video project by Rand Borden when he was a student at the School of the Museum of Fine Arts, Boston. The first character created was Midori no Kaiju (Japanese for "Big Green Monster"), which Borden assembled from upholstery foam coated with latex.

While the video project never came to fruition, another student suggested that more characters be created to fight Midori no Kaiju at live competitions, or, Big Battels. The first Battel occurred on Halloween night in 1996 at the Revolving Museum in Boston and featured Midori No Kaiju, as well as Atomic Cannon, Powa Ranjuru, Force Trooper Robo, Taro "The Mouth" Fuji's commentary, and Anthony Salbino's construction. The first full-scale Kaiju Big Battel event was held in March 1997 in Boston, Massachusetts at the School of the Museum of Fine Arts. The earliest performances in other cities included matches with other troupes of costumed wrestlers at venues such as Fort Thunder in Providence, Rhode Island. Borden has created more than 120 monster costumes, which he keeps in storage.

Borden formed Studio Kaiju hiring his brother, David, as manager in 2000. Kaiju Big Battel: Terebi Sento was the studio's first DVD release, showcasing four matches from 2001 and several bonus features. Kaiju Big Battel: A Practical Guide to Giant City-Crushing Monsters, a comedic history of the first 8 years of Kaiju Big Battel, was published in 2004 by Hyperion Press.

Studio Kaiju was dissolved in 2011 and Rand Borden returned to producing Kaiju on his own.  Kaiju Big Battel performed at Twitchcon 2017 at an event that was simultaneously broadcast on Twitch, and on May 4, 2019 Kaiju Big Battel held their first European event at Alexandra Palace in London.

Notable characters

Dusto Bunny is a monstrous anthropomorphic dust bunny. His height is "one billion dust mites", and he weighs "64 tons (mostly fluff)".
French Toast is a giant waffle with a French accent. His nickname is "The Awful Waffle".
Kung-Fu Chicken Noodle is a martial artist wielding a cleaver and wearing a can of soup over his torso. He weighs "120 fluid tons".
Dr. Cube is the main villain of Kaiju Big Battel. He is a disfigured plastic surgeon who wears a white box over his face to hide his scars. He uses genetic modification and mind-control to command an army of kaiju to destroy mankind and control the earth. His character was created after Rand Borden found a surgical gown and a box.
American Beetle is an American-born hero "so proud of his Mexican heritage that he only speaks Spanish"
Referee "You Call that a Knife" Dundee keeps order in the big ring.

Kickstarter projects
Studio Kaiju has run two Kickstarter campaigns. The first, 20 Years of Kaiju Big Battel Posters, was launched in June 2016 and was to be a hardcover art book featuring posters from Kaiju shows. The campaign failed to meet its stated goal of $20,000. A second Kickstarter for Kaiju Big Battel figurines was launched in August 2018 and successfully raised $21,396.

Kaiju Big Battel: Fighto Fantasy
On October 31, 2018 a Kaiju Big Battel video game was released on PC and mobile platforms. The game was developed by Super Walrus Games and is a satire of Final Fantasy style RPGs from the '90s.

Political themes
Story lines for events are inspired by the American political atmosphere at the time. During the time when Obamacare was being legislated, the character of American Beetle switched from a Republican to a Democrat because he needed insurance for surgery. Quotes from former American President Donald Trump were sometimes used in speeches made by the main villain, Dr. Cube.

References

External links
Official Kaiju Big Battel website
Interview with MC Louden Noxious on Late Night Wallflower (2007)

G4 (American TV network) original programming
American children's animated science fantasy television series
English-language television shows
2006 American television series debuts
2007 American television series endings
American professional wrestling promotions
Kaiju
Tokusatsu